Demotika may refer to:

 Greek folk music
 Didymoteicho, a town in Thrace once commonly known as Demotika (Bulgarian Dimotika, Turkish Dimetoka)
 Lordship of Demotika, a medieval crusader state based on Didymoteicho
 Demotika, Turkey, site of ancient Didymateiche